Min barndoms jul is a 1978 Mia Marianne och Per Filip Christmas album.

Track listing
När juldagsmorgon glimmar (trad.)
Det är en ros utsprungen (Es ist ein Ros entsprungen) – (trad.)
O kom alla trogna (Adeste Fideles) – (John Francis Wade)
Min barndoms jul – (K E Filip Olsson, Emil Hagström)
Afton i advent – (K E Filip Olsson, Emil Hagström)
O helga natt (Cantique de Noël) (Adolphe Adam)
Mariae Wiegenlied  (op 76:52)  (Maria går i rosengård) – Max Reger
Stilla natt (Stille Nacht, Heilige Nacht) – Franz Gruber
 Julvisa (op 1:4) (Stille Nacht, Heilige Nacht) – Zacharias Topelius, Jean Sibelius
Kanske det är natt hos dig – Per Filip, Bo Setterlind
Betlehems stjärna (Gläns över sjö och strand) – Alice Tegnér, Viktor Rydberg
Psaltarpsalm, nr 24 (Davids psalm, nr 24) (Gören portarna höga) / G. Wennerberg

Charts

References

1978 Christmas albums
Christmas albums by Swedish artists
Mia Marianne och Per Filip albums